The Hegang–Dalian Expressway, designated as G11 and commonly referred to as the Heda Expressway is an expressway that connects the cities of Hegang, Heilongjiang, China, and Dalian, Liaoning. When fully complete, it will be  in length. The expressway runs parallel to G201 Road for all its length.

The expressway is mostly complete. However, the section that passes through central Jiamusi has not been built to expressway standards. Upon reaching Jiamusi, vehicles for Hegang have to exit the expressway and make an 11 km journey at a reduced speed before entering the final stretch of the expressway for Hegang. In response, a 25.837 km expressway section that links the two parts of the expressway is currently being built by the Jiamusi municipal government.

Detailed Itinerary

References 

AH1
11
Expressways in Heilongjiang
Expressways in Jilin
Expressways in Liaoning